Jean Démaret (6 September 1897 – 15 May 1967) was a French architect. His work was part of the architecture event in the art competition at the 1948 Summer Olympics.

References

1897 births
1967 deaths
20th-century French architects
Olympic competitors in art competitions
People from Charleville-Mézières